Pinnacle Gap is a gap between Pain and Tobin Mesas in the Mesa Range of Victoria Land. The feature was traversed and so named by the northern party of New Zealand Geological Survey Antarctic Expedition (NZGSAE), 1962–63, because it is readily identified by the high rock pinnacle (Mount Ballou) on the north ridge overlooking the gap.

Mountain passes of Victoria Land
Pennell Coast